Get Up and Go may refer to:

A song first recorded by The Weavers and then Pete Seeger
A song by Cinerama on Torino (album)
A song by the Go-Go's on Vacation (The Go-Go's album)
A song by The Rutles
Get Up and Go!, a 1981-1983 British children's series
Another name for the Timed Up and Go test, a medical test used to evaluate a patient's abilities to perform activities of daily living